The Winterthur tramway network was part of the public transport network of the city of Winterthur, in the canton of Zürich, Switzerland, for more than 50 years.

Opened in 1898, the network also served the neighbouring communities of Töss, Wülflingen, Oberwinterthur and Seen, all of which were incorporated into the municipality of Winterthur in 1922.  After reaching its maximum extent in 1931, the network was gradually replaced from 1938 by the Winterthur trolleybus system, until the network's closure in 1951.

Throughout its existence, the network's operator was the Gesellschaft Winterthur-Töss (WT), which was renamed Städtische Strassenbahn Winterthur (StStW) in 1900 and Verkehrsbetriebe Winterthur (VW) in 1940.  The company still exists today, as Stadtbus Winterthur (DE).

History
The tramway network, which opened on 13 July 1898, was the second form of public transport in Winterthur, after a horse bus service, which had run between 1895 and 1897. It served as a complement to the existing Winterthur–Bülach–Koblenz railway line, which had been in service since 1876, and which already had a station at Töss.

The trams on the first tramway ran every 10 minutes, and a single ticket cost ten Rappen.  The city centre terminus was initially not outside the railway station, but at the Restaurant Wartmann – that is, at the junction of the Wartstrasse and the Rudolfstrasse and thus on the western side of the station yard.  The Töss terminus was located approximately at the current Töss Zentrum trolleybus stop.

Initially, the trams were stored and maintained in a wooden depot on the grounds of the Töss-based Maschinenfabrik Rieter. Rieter was also engaged by the city as general contractor in respect of the tracks, the catenary and the first generation trams. In addition, the company was responsible for supplying electric current to the catenary until 1904, when the Winterthur municipal power station took over that task. The voltage used to power the network was 550 volts DC.

After the turn of the century, the network was extended as follows:

[1] = Simultaneously, the circa 200 m long section in the Rudolfstrasse was closed.
[2] = Simultaneously, the non-passenger carrying line in Töss was closed.

Additionally, on 31 October 1914, the StStW opened a tram deport of its own in Tösstalstrasse in the present-day Mattenbach quarter.  This so-called Depot Deutweg remains in service to this day, as a bus garage.

Any further expansion of tram routes – for example, a proposed extension to the central cemetery in Rosenberg – remained unrealised, as a consequence of either the introduction of motor bus services in 1931, or the forced conversion to trolleybuses from 1938.

Following a referendum on 20 February 1938, the tramway network was replaced by trolleybus routes as follows:

See also

List of town tramway systems in Switzerland

References

Notes

Books

External links

Trambahn Winterthur – description with images 
Als das Rumpeln und Lärmen ein Ende hatte – Ende des Winterthurer Trambetriebs vor 50 Jahren, Neue Zürcher Zeitung, 18. Oktober 2001 – newspaper article marking the 50th anniversary of the network's closure 

This article is based upon a translation of the German language version as at November 2012.

Winterthur
Transport in Winterthur
Winterthur, Trams in